Wilson's Mills is a town in Johnston County, North Carolina, United States. In 2010, the population was 2,277, up from 1,291 in 2000. As of 2018, the estimated population was 2,689.

Geography
Wilson's Mills is located in north-central Johnston County at  (35.577671, -78.355791). U.S. Route 70 passes through the southern side of the town, leading northwest  to Raleigh and southeast  to Interstate 95 at Selma.

Demographics

2020 census

As of the 2020 United States census, there were 2,534 people, 840 households, and 648 families residing in the town.

2000 census
As of the census of 2000, there were 1,291 people, 465 households, and 357 families residing in the town. The population density was 352.9 people per square mile (136.2/km). There were 505 housing units at an average density of 138.0 per square mile (53.3/km). The racial makeup of the town was 73.04% White, 23.93% African American, 0.54% Native American, 2.32% from other races, and 0.15% from two or more races. Hispanic or Latino of any race were 4.88% of the population.

There were 465 households, of which 41.7% had children under the age of 18 living with them, 60.2% were married couples living together, 12.7% had a female householder with no husband present, and 23.2% were non-families. 19.8% of all households were made up of individuals, and 7.3% had someone living alone who was 65 years of age or older. The average household size was 2.78 and the average family size was 3.19.

In the town, the population was spread out, with 30.1% under the age of 18, 6.9% from 18 to 24, 35.8% from 25 to 44, 20.6% from 45 to 64, and 6.6% who were 65 years of age or older. The median age was 32 years. For every 100 females, there were 99.8 males. For every 100 females age 18 and over, there were 94.4 males.

The median income for a household in the town was $44,650, and the median income for a family was $49,219. Males had a median income of $33,150 versus $25,188 for females. The per capita income for the town was $17,157. About 9.4% of families and 9.8% of the population were below the poverty line, including 14.0% of those under age 18 and 9.1% of those age 65 or over.

Law and government
Wilson's Mills operates under a council-manager government. The town council consists of the mayor and five council members. All council members are elected at-large.

Education
 Wilson's Mills Elementary School

References

External links
 Town of Wilson's Mills official website

1868 establishments in North Carolina
Populated places established in 1868
Populated places on the Neuse River
Towns in Johnston County, North Carolina
Towns in North Carolina